Love Sick Radio is the debut EP by former Hinder lead singer Austin John Winkler. The EP was released April 22, 2016.

Summary
After Austin announced his departure from Hinder in  November 2013, he quickly stated he would be continuing his career as a solo artist.

While writing and recording for his debut release as a solo artist, Austin communicated with fans through his social media sites, mainly Instagram. He did this for over 2 years, releasing lyric sheets, demos and audio clips while giving fans insight into his life while going through the process of becoming a solo artist.

Austin announced he signed a record deal with Universal Music Group in October 2014 as a solo artist.

Release
Throughout the fall of 2015 Austin released numerous mastered audio clips of his new songs weekly on his Instagram page. He stated he would be releasing the audio clips to promote his upcoming EP, which he then stated would be released "very soon".

Track listing

References

External links

Austin John Winkler albums
2016 debut EPs
Universal Music Group EPs